A Medical Officer to The King/Queen accompanies His/Her Majesty on overseas tour.

He is normally a senior Royal Navy surgeon. He is not, strictly, a member of the Medical Household of the Royal Household of the Sovereign of the United Kingdom.

During Royal Tours, he is described as "The Medical Officer to The King/Queen Abroad."

List of officers 
 Surgeon Captain David Hett MRCS LRCP FRCA Royal Navy 2007–
 Surgeon Captain David Swain CVO MB ChB FFARCS DA DObst RCOG QHP Royal Navy 1993–2007
 Surgeon Captain Professor Sir Norman Blacklock KCVO OBE MB ChB MSc FRCS Royal Navy 1976–1993
 Surgeon Commander Philip Fulford MVO Royal Navy 1967–1977
 Surgeon Vice-Admiral Sir Derek Steele-Perkins KCB KCVO FRACS DLO QHS c.1953–c.1963
 Surgeon Rear-Admiral Sir Henry White KCVO OBE MB ChB MD FRCSEdin c.1920–c.1947

References 

Positions within the British Royal Household